The 2010 Hart District Council election took place on 6 May 2010, on the same day as the United Kingdom General Election. One third of the council was up for re-election, the Conservatives gained three seats, one from Community Campaign Hart and the two independent seats, whilst the Liberal Democrats remained on 10 seats. With an increase from 17 seats to 20, the Conservatives gained a majority and administration of the council, which had been under no overall control since 2005.After the election, the composition of the council was:

 Conservative: 20
 Liberal Democrats: 10
 Community Campaign (Hart): 5

Election results 
The Conservatives had last been in administration between 2000-2005, with the council remaining under no overall control until this election, albeit with the Conservatives remaining as the largest party. The 2010 election saw the Conservatives gain three seats, the Crondall seat from Community Campaign Hart, and Fleet Central and Hartley Wintney from independent councillors, whilst the Liberal Democrats made no gains or losses. As such, the Conservatives gained an overall majority of the council with 20 councillors.

Ward results

Church Crookham East

Church Crookham West

Crondall

Fleet Central

Fleet North

Fleet Pondtail

Fleet West

Frogmore and Darby Green

Hartley Wintney

Hook

Long Sutton

Yateley North

References 
Hart District Council elections
2010 English local elections
2010s in Hampshire